Eupithecia wardi is a moth in the family Geometridae. It is found in Tibet.

References

Moths described in 1958
wardi
Moths of Asia